Yuxarı Sarıcalı (also, Sarydzhaly) is a village and municipality in the Tartar Rayon of Azerbaijan.

References 

Populated places in Tartar District